Colonel Buster Mills (September 16, 1908 – December 1, 1991) was an American outfielder, coach, scout and interim manager in Major League Baseball.  A native of Ranger, Texas, in his playing days, he stood  (181.6 cm) tall, weighed 195 pounds (88.5 kg), and threw and batted righthanded.

His father, Elvis, owned a general store in Ranger, Texas. Elvis and Lucy Mills gave their fourth child the first name of Colonel, after the rank of either Elvis's best friend or a Civil War great-uncle. (During World War II, he enjoyed introducing himself to officers as "Colonel Mills".) He lettered in football, basketball, track and baseball at the University of Oklahoma and was named all-Big Six quarterback. He graduated with a degree in geology in 1931.

A St. Louis Cardinals scout saw him hit for the cycle (including two doubles) in a baseball game against Washington University in St. Louis. However, when he asked for the player's name, he was told it was Wahl. The scout had to leave, but left a message to sign the (wrong) player. Mills signed with Cleveland, but ended up in the extensive St. Louis Cardinals farm system during the early 1930s, receiving a 29-game trial with the  "Gashouse Gang" Cardinals and then a 17-game tryout with the  Brooklyn Dodgers. He played the rest of his MLB career in the American League for the Boston Red Sox, St. Louis Browns, New York Yankees and Cleveland Indians (1937–40; 1942; 1946). He was traded along with Bobo Newsom and Red Kress from the Red Sox to the Browns for Joe Vosmik on December 3, 1937. Overall, he played in 415 games, and compiled a lifetime batting average of .287 with 14 home runs and 163 runs batted in. In , Mills batted .397 in 63 at bats for the Yankees, largely as a pinch hitter.

After military service in World War II, Mills became a coach for the Indians (1946), Chicago White Sox (1947–50), Cincinnati Redlegs (1953) and Red Sox (1954) and managed in minor league baseball. He was the interim manager of the 1953 Redlegs, finishing the unexpired term of Rogers Hornsby, who resigned late in the season. Mills' record in Cincinnati was 4–4 (.500). 

After his coaching career, Mills spent many seasons as a scout for the Kansas City Athletics, then the Yankees.

He died in Arlington, Texas, at the age of 83.

References

Spink, J.G. Taylor, ed., The Baseball Register 1954 edition. St. Louis: The Sporting News.

External links

1908 births
1991 deaths
Baseball players from Texas
Boston Red Sox coaches
Boston Red Sox players
Brooklyn Dodgers players
Chicago White Sox coaches
Cincinnati Redlegs coaches
Cincinnati Redlegs managers
Cleveland Indians coaches
Cleveland Indians players
Elmira Red Wings players
Kansas City Athletics scouts
Kansas City Blues (baseball) players
New York Yankees players
New York Yankees scouts
Major League Baseball first base coaches
Major League Baseball outfielders
Major League Baseball third base coaches
Mobile Red Warriors players
Newark Bears (IL) players
Rochester Red Wings players
St. Louis Browns players
St. Louis Cardinals players
People from Ranger, Texas
Oklahoma Sooners baseball players